Corymbia plena is a species of tree that is endemic to central Queensland. It has rough, chunky, tessellated bark on the trunk and branches, lance-shaped to curved adult leaves, flower buds in groups of seven, creamy white flowers and urn-shaped to barrel-shaped fruit.

Description
It has thick, rough, chunky tessellated bark on the trunk and branches. Flowering occurs from April to May and the flowers are creamy white. The fruit is a woody urn-shaped to barrel-shaped capsule with the valves enclosed in the fruit.

Taxonomy and naming
Corymbia plena was first formally described in 1995 by Ken Hill and Lawrie Johnson. The specific epithet (plena) is from the Latin plenus meaning "full" or "stout", referring to the relatively large fruit.

Distribution and habitat
This bloodwood mostly grows in deep sandy or lateritic soil and is widespread and locally abundant between Pentland, Hughenden, Barcaldine and Tambo.

Conservation status
This species is listed as of "least concern" under the Queensland Government Nature Conservation Act 1992.

See also
 List of Corymbia species

References

plena
Myrtales of Australia
Flora of Queensland
Plants described in 1995